Shihab al-Din Ahmad ibn Muhammad ibn Umar al-Khafaji an Egyptian Hanafi-Maturidi scholar and poet who spent some time in Istanbul and while there was appointed Qadi al-Qudah (chief judge) of Egypt.

Works 
Among his well-known writings are:
 Hashiya (marginal commentary) on the Quranic commentary of al-Baydawi, titled: 'Inayat al-Qadi wa-Kifayat al-Radi.
  Commentary on al-Shifa bi Ta'rif Huquq al-Mustafa of al-Qadi 'Iyad, titled: Naseem al-Riyadh fi Sharh Shifa' al-Qadi 'Iyad.

See also 
 List of Hanafis
 List of Ash'aris and Maturidis

References

External links
 The Biography of Shihab al-Din al-Khafaji 

1569 births
1659 deaths
16th-century Arabs
17th-century Arabs
Hanafis
Maturidis
Asharis
Al-Azhar University alumni
16th-century Muslim theologians
Egyptian imams
Egyptian Sunni Muslims
Egyptian poets
Egyptian male poets
Critics of Ibn Taymiyya
Critics of Ibn al-Qayyim
Sunni imams
Sharia judges
Quranic exegesis scholars
17th-century Muslim theologians